The 2018 Spanish Athletics Championships was the 98th edition of the national championship in outdoor track and field for Spain. It was held on 21 and 22 July at the Polideportivo Juan de la Cierva in Getafe. It served as the selection meeting for Spain at the 2018 European Athletics Championships.

The club championships in relays and combined track and field events were contested separately from the main competition.

Results

Men

Women

Notes

References
Results
XCVIII Campeonato de España Absoluto . Royal Spanish Athletics Federation. Retrieved 2019-06-26.

External links 
 Official website of the Royal Spanish Athletics Federation 

2018
Spanish Athletics Championships
Spanish Championships
Athletics Championships
Sport in Getafe